Tost Tosonbumba Nature Reserve is a nature reserve in Mongolia, dedicated to conserving the snow leopard (Panthera uncia).

History
Following an ecological study in the South Gobi Desert, starting in 2009, and the killing of a snow leopard by herders protecting their livestock, the Tost Tosonbumba was established as a local protection area the following year. Bayarjargal Agvaantseren established a livestock insurance programme and lead a campaign to persuade the government to establish a reserve. In 2010 Tost Tosonbumba was established as a local protected area, which then had 37 mining licenses. Under local protection rules it was possible to revoke some licenses and prevent others being issued. Mining operations fragment habitats and drive nomadic communities into snow cat territory, resulting in conflict. Following a campaign for higher protection, in April 2016 the area was declared a nature reserve and all mining licenses were revoked.

References

External links
 Snow Leopard Trust

Gobi Desert
Protected areas established in 2016
Nature reserves in Mongolia